Hey, Jeannie!, retitled The Jeannie Carson Show during its second season and also during later prime-time reruns, is an American situation comedy that aired on CBS during the 1956-1957 television season and in first-run syndication during 1958. The series stars Jeannie Carson as a naïve young Scottish woman who emigrates to New York City.

Synopsis
Jeannie MacLennan is a young Scottish woman who emigrates from the United Kingdom to New York City. Sweet and naïve, she arrives with no job and no place to stay. Taxicab driver Al Murray comes to her assistance and is named as her sponsor. Jeannie moves in with Al and his sister, Liz, in Brooklyn. During Season 1, Jeannie moves from job to job — salesgirl in a doughnut shop, golf caddie, Chinese restaurant manager, executive secretary, taxicab dispatcher, policewoman — and encounters unusual people and situations as she learns about what to her are strange American customs.

In Season 2, with the show retitled The Jeannie Carson Show, Jeannie has settled into a career as an airline stewardess and has moved into a new apartment. Her boss at the airline is the chief stewardess, Mabel, and Herbert is a flight engineer who often is part of the crew on Jeannie's flights. Her new landlord is Charlie O'Connell.

Cast
 Jeannie Carson...Jeannie MacLennan
 Allen Jenkins...Al Murray (1956–1957)
 Jane Dulo...Liz Murray (1956–1957)
 Jack Kirkwood...Charlie O'Connell (1958)
 Vera Vague...Mabel (1958)
 William Schallert...Herbert (1958)

Production
Jeannie Carson was performing in her breakout role in the musical Love from Judy at the Saville Theatre in London in 1952–1953 when producer Max Liebman saw her in that production. He signed her to a contract to appear on television in the United States. Hey, Jeannie! gave Carson her first starring role on American television.

Four Star-Tartan and Jeannie Productions produced Hey, Jeannie! and The Jeannie Carson Show. Carson sang a song in most episodes.

Broadcast history

Hey, Jeannie! premiered on CBS on September 8, 1956. CBS cancelled it after a single season, and the last of its 26 original episodes on CBS aired on March 16, 1957. CBS then broadcast reruns of Hey, Jeannie! for another seven weeks, from March 23 to May 4, 1957. The show aired from 9:30 to 10:00 p.m. Eastern Time on Saturdays throughout its CBS run.

After CBS cancelled Hey Jeannie!, the show underwent a change in premise and was retitled The Jeannie Carson Show for its second season. Only six episodes were produced for the second season, and they ran in first-run syndication in the United States during 1958.

ABC broadcast reruns of Hey, Jeannie! under the title The Jeannie Carson Show from June 30 to September 22, 1960, as a summer replacement for The Pat Boone Chevy Showroom. The reruns ran on Thursdays at 9:00 p.m. Eastern Time.

Episodes

Season 1: Hey, Jeannie! (1956–1957)
SOURCE

Season 2: The Jeannie Carson Show (1958)
SOURCE

References

External links
 
 Opening credits for Season 2, The Jeannie Carson Show, on YouTube

1950s American sitcoms
1956 American television series debuts
1958 American television series endings
Black-and-white American television shows
CBS original programming
Television shows set in New York City
English-language television shows
Television series about immigration
Works about immigration to the United States
Television series about flight attendants